Sam Cliff (born 3 October 1987) is an English cricketer who played at First-class, List A and Twenty20 level for Leicestershire between 2007 and 2011.

He made his first-class debut in 2007, in a game against Oxford University, which his team won by an innings margin. He took one wicket in the first innings, that of former Nottinghamshire CB player Peter Wilshaw.

References

External links

1987 births
English cricketers
Living people
Leicestershire cricketers
Berkshire cricketers
English cricketers of the 21st century
Cricketers from Nottingham